Amnicola walkeri, common name Canadian duskysnail, is a species of freshwater snail, an aquatic gastropod mollusk in the family Amnicolidae.

The name is in honor of Mr. Bryant Walker.

Shell description 
The shell is thin, narrowly umbilicate, conic, shaped like Lyogyrus brownii Carpenter. The color of the shell is slightly yellowish corneous. The shell is thin, smooth, with faint growth-lines. The shell has 4 whorls that are very convex and separated by deeply
constricting sutures. The last whorl is rounded below. The apex is  obtuse.

The aperture is oblique, rather small, mainly basal, a little longer than wide, but nearly circular. The inner margin is a trifle straightened above. The peristome is continuous, in contact with the preceding whorl for an extremely short distance above. Operculum is amnicoloid.

The width of the shell is 2-2.125 mm. The height of the shell is 2.33–3 mm. The width of aperture is 1-1.125 mm. The height of aperture is 1.08-1.25 mm.

Anatomy 
The radula is amnicoloid.

Distribution 
Type locality is Lake Michigan at High Island Harbor, Beaver Island, at 10 meters depth.

Other localities include: Reed's Lake, Grand Rapids, Michigan; River Rouge, Wayne County, Michigan.

References
This article incorporates public domain text from reference.

Amnicola
Gastropods described in 1898